Hiyya bar Ashi (or Rav Hiyya bar Ashi; Hebrew: רב חייא בר אשי) was a second and third generation Amora sage of Babylon.

Biography
In his youth he studied under Rav, and served as his janitor. In his service of Rav he learned many laws, which he transmitted to future generations. For example, he stated that on Shabbat he would wash Rav's leather clothes. From this statement, the sages concluded that the law of Melabain (Scouring/Laundering) on Shabbat does not apply on leather materials. He also stated that when he used to wake Rav from his sleep, he would wash his hands, recite Birkat HaTorah, and only then would teach the lesson. Hence, one should make a Birkat HaTorah also on the Talmud, and not only on the Bible. Later, R. Hiyya bar Ashi said, Rav would put on tefillin, and then recite the shema; from this the sages concluded that one should put on tefillin before the shema, even if it is already time for the shema.

Most of R. Hiyya bar Ashi's statements are made in the name of his teacher Rav, and rarely in the name of Samuel of Nehardea. At times his own rulings are cited as well, and sometimes he disputes his teacher Rav.

He was a colleague of Rav Huna and had debated him over rulings of their common teacher, Rav.

References

Talmud rabbis of Babylonia